This is a list of earthquakes in 1952. Only magnitude 6.0 or greater earthquakes appear on the list. Lower magnitude events are included if they have caused death, injury or damage. Events which occurred in remote areas will be excluded from the list as they wouldn't have generated significant media interest. All dates are listed according to UTC time. Two events dominated 1952 in seismic terms. Firstly in March a magnitude 8.1 earthquake struck Japan resulting in a robust aftershock sequence. Then in November, a magnitude 9.0 earthquake rocked the Kamchatka area of Russia. This event was the largest and deadliest of the year. The Kamchatka quake was not only the largest of 1952, but also one of the largest of all time.

Overall

By death toll 

 Note: At least 10 casualties

By magnitude 

 Note: At least 7.0 magnitude

Notable events

January

February

March

April

May

June

July

August

September

October

November

December

Kamchatka aftershock table

References

1952
 
1952